The 2018 European Le Mans Series was the fifteenth season of the Automobile Club de l'Ouest's (ACO) European Le Mans Series. The six-event season began at Circuit Paul Ricard on 15 April and finished at Algarve International Circuit on 28 October. The series is open to Le Mans Prototypes, divided into the LMP2 and LMP3 classes, and grand tourer-style racing cars in the LMGTE class.

Calendar
The provisional 2018 calendar was announced on 23 September 2017. The calendar comprises six events, featuring the same six circuits that hosted events in the 2017 season. The rounds at Silverstone and Paul Ricard swapped their places in the calendar, with the French circuit hosting the opening round and Silverstone moving to an August date, once again in conjunction with the FIA World Endurance Championship.

The official pre-season test also returned to Paul Ricard after a one-year absence, having taken place at Autodromo Nazionale di Monza in 2017.

Entries

LMP2
In accordance with the 2017 LMP2 regulations, all cars in the LMP2 class use the Gibson GK428 V8 engine.

LMP3
All cars in the LMP3 class use the Nissan VK50VE 5.0 L V8 engine and Michelin tyres.

LMGTE
All cars in the LMGTE class use Dunlop tyres.

Results and Standings
Bold indicates overall winner.

To be classified a car will have to cross  the  finish  line  on  the  race  track  when the  chequered  flag  is  shown,  except  in  a  case  of force majeure at the Stewards’ discretion and have  covered  at  least  70% (the  official  number  of  laps  will  be  rounded down to the nearest whole number) of the  distance  covered  by  the  car  classified  in  first  place  in  the overall classification.

Teams Championships
Points are awarded according to the following structure:

LMP2 Teams Championship

LMP3 Teams Championship

LMGTE Teams Championship

Drivers Championships
Points are awarded according to the following structure:

LMP2 Drivers Championship

LMP3 Drivers Championship

LMGTE Drivers Championship

Notes

References

External links
 

European Le Mans Series seasons
European Le Mans Series
Le Mans Series